The yellowish imperial pigeon (Ducula subflavescens), also known as the yellow-tinted imperial pigeon or Bismarck imperial pigeon (leading to easy confusion with D. melanochroa), is a relatively large species of bird in the family Columbidae. It is endemic to forest and woodland in the Bismarck Archipelago. It is threatened by habitat loss.

It is often considered a subspecies of the Torresian imperial pigeon (which in turn sometimes is considered a subspecies of the pied imperial pigeon), but is increasingly treated as a separate species. It resembles the Torresian imperial pigeon, but has a distinctly yellow-tinged plumage and a bluish base to the bill.

References

Ducula
Birds of the Bismarck Archipelago
Taxonomy articles created by Polbot
Birds described in 1886